Parashurama is a mythical warrior saint and avatar of Vishnu.

Parashurama (alternatively Parashuram, Parasurama, Parasuram, Parshuram, Poroshuram, Porshuram) may also refer to:
 Rajshekhar Basu, an Indian writer who wrote under the pen name Parashurama (alternatively spelled Parshuram, Poroshuram or Parashuram)
 Parshuram Upazila, an administrative area in Bangladesh (alternatively spelled Parashuram or Porshuram)
 Parshuram, Dadeldhura, a municipality in Dadeldhura district in Nepal
 Parashuram (1989 film), a Kannada language film
Parashuram (1979 film), a Bengali drama film
Parasuram (2003 film), an Indian Tamil-language action film
Parasuram (director), Indian film director and screenwrite
 Parasuram Express, an express train that runs between the Indian cities of Mangalore and Thiruvananthapuram.
 Parsuram Majhi, a member of the Indian Parliament.

See also
 Parshuram (disambiguation)